Penfold, sometimes spelt Pinfold, is an English-language surname. The name Penfold can be found in written records dating back to the reign of Alfred the Great. In Middle English, a pinfold was a pound or an open enclosure for stray (or improperly supervised) domesticated animals.

Notable people with the surname Penfold include:
Adrian Penfold (born 1952), British planning expert
Bernard Penfold (1916–2015), British Army officer
Christopher Penfold, British writer and producer in radio and television
Christopher Rawson Penfold (1811-1870), Viticulturist and entrepreneur of South Australia's wine industry
David Penfold (born 1964), field hockey player from New Zealand
Frank C. Penfold (1849–1921), American artist and teacher
George Saxby Penfold DD (1770–1846), a Church of England clergyman
Hilary Penfold (born 1953), Australian parliamentary counsel and judge
John Penfold (1828–1909), British surveyor and architect
John Penfold (priest) (1864–1922), British Anglican priest
Liz Penfold (born 1947), Australian politician
Mary Penfold (1820-1895), Viticulturist and entrepreneur of South Australia's wine industry
Mark Penfold (born 1956), English professional footballer
Merimeri Penfold (1920–2014), New Zealand Māori educator
Peter Penfold (born 1944), British diplomat
Robert Penfold (born 1951), Foreign Correspondent for Australia's Nine News
 William Penfold, early settler and founder of the village of Penfield, South Australia

Notable people with the surname Pinfold include:
 Allan Pinfold (born 1929), ring name of Australian professional wrestler Johnny Gilday
 Elizabeth Pinfold (1859–1927), New Zealand activist for the Belgian Relief Fund in WW I
 James Pinfold (born 1950), English-Canadian physicist

English-language surnames